On September 8, 2008, Intel began shipping its first mainstream solid-state drives (SSDs), the X18-M and X25-M with 80 GB and 160 GB storage capacities. Reviews measured high performance with these MLC-based drives. Intel released its SLC-based Enterprise X25-E Extreme SSDs on October 15 that same year in capacities of 32GB and 64GB.

In July 2009, Intel moved its X25-M and X18-M lines from a 50-nanometer to a 34-nanometer process. These new drives, dubbed by the press as the X25-M and X18-M G2 (or generation 2), reduced prices by up to 60 percent while offering lower latency and improved performance.

On February 1, 2010, Intel and Micron announced that they were gearing up for production of NAND flash memory using a new 25-nanometer process. In March of that same year, Intel entered the budget SSD segment with its X25-V drives with an initial capacity of 40 GB. The SSD 310, Intel's first mSATA drive was released in December 2010, providing X25-M G2 performance in a much smaller package.

March 2011 saw the introduction of two new SSD lines from Intel. The first, the SSD 510, used an SATA 6 Gigabit per second interface to reach speeds of up to 500 MB/s. The drive, which uses a controller from Marvell Technology Group, was released using 34 nm NAND Flash and came in capacities of 120 GB and 250 GB. The second product announcement, the SSD 320, is the successor to Intel's earlier X25-M. It uses the new 25 nm process that Intel and Micron announced in 2010, and was released in capacities of 40, 80, 120, 160, 300 and 600 GB. Sequential read performance maxes out at 270 MB/s due to the older SATA 3 Gbit/s interface, and sequential write performance varies greatly based on the size of the drive with sequential write performance of the 40 GB model peaking at 45 MB/s and the 600 GB at 220 MB/s.

Micron and Intel announced that they were producing their first 20 nm MLC NAND flash on April 14, 2011.

In February 2012, Intel launched the SSD 520 series solid state drives using the SandForce SF-2200 controller with sequential read and write speeds of 550 and 520 MB/s respectively with random read and write IOPS as high as 80,000. These drives will replace the 510 series. Intel has released the budget 330 series solid state drive in 60, 120, and 180 GB capacities using 25 nm flash memory and a SandForce controller that have replaced the 320 series.

In late 2015, Intel announced that they were producing their first consumer PCIe-based solid state drive, to be named the 750 series. These new drives would either be plugged directly into a compatible PCIe 3.0 x4 slot or into the U.2 connector on the motherboard.

In 2017, Intel launched the 900P series Optane SSDs based on 3D XPoint technology as opposed to NAND flash memory. The price and speed of Optane memory is between that of DRAM and NAND. Prices are 2x-5x that of SSDs at announcement with significantly reduced latency.

List

References

Intel products
Intel